The 2017 Cotton Bowl Classic was a college football bowl game played on December 29, 2017, at AT&T Stadium in Arlington, Texas. It featured the Ohio State Buckeyes from the Big Ten Conference and the USC Trojans from the Pac-12 Conference. The 82nd Cotton Bowl Classic was one of the 2017–18 bowl games that concluded the 2017 FBS football season.

The game was broadcast on ESPN, ESPN Deportes, ESPN Radio and XM Satellite Radio. It was sponsored by the Goodyear Tire and Rubber Company and was officially known as the Goodyear Cotton Bowl Classic.

Teams
The Cotton Bowl was played by Pac-12 Conference champion USC Trojans and Big Ten Conference champion Ohio State Buckeyes. These teams were chosen by the CFP Selection Committee.  Traditionally, the Pac-12 and Big Ten champions meet in the Rose Bowl, however in the 2017 season, that game will be used for one of the two College Football Playoff semifinal games.  Of note is that this year's Rose Bowl features SEC champion Georgia and Big 12 champion Oklahoma, a matchup which traditionally occurs in the Sugar Bowl, which is being used as the other CFP semifinal game for this year.

Prior to kickoff, the Trojans led the all-time series 13-9-1; the most recent game was on September 12, 2009, where the Trojans defeated the Buckeyes by a score of 18–15, scoring with 1:05 remaining in the game to go ahead to stay. USC had won the last 7 games in the series, with Ohio State's last win coming in the 1974 Rose Bowl.

This is the eighth time that the schools met in a bowl game.  The previous seven bowl meetings were all in the Rose Bowl, most recently in 1985—a game the Trojans won, 20–17.

The Buckeyes defeated the Trojans 24–7.  With the victory, the all-time series between the schools now stands at 13-10-1 in favor of USC.

Game summary

Scoring summary

Statistics

References

Cotton Bowl Classic
Cotton Bowl Classic
Ohio State Buckeyes football bowl games
USC Trojans football bowl games
2017 in sports in Texas
21st century in Arlington, Texas
Cotton Bowl Classic